Sulpiride, sold under the brand name Dogmatil among others, is an atypical antipsychotic (although some texts have referred to it as a typical antipsychotic) medication of the benzamide class which is used mainly in the treatment of psychosis associated with schizophrenia and major depressive disorder, and sometimes used in low dosage to treat anxiety and mild depression. Sulpiride is commonly used in Asia, Central America, Europe, South Africa and South America. Levosulpiride is its purified levo-isomer and is sold in India for similar purpose. It is not approved in the United States, Canada, or Australia. The drug is chemically and clinically similar to amisulpride.

Medical uses
Sulpiride's primary use in medicine is in the management of the symptoms of schizophrenia. It has been used as both a monotherapy and adjunctive therapy (in case of treatment-resistance) in schizophrenia. It has also been used in the treatment of dysthymia. There is evidence, although low quality, that Sulpiride could accelerate antidepressant response in patients with major depressive disorder. There is also evidence of its efficacy in treating panic disorder. Sulpiride is indicated for the treatment of vertigo in some countries. In Japan, Sulpiride is both approved as a treatment for schizophrenia and for major depressive disorder (low dose).

Contraindications
Contraindications

 Hypersensitivity to sulpiride
 Pre-existing breast cancer or other prolactin-dependent tumors
 Phaeochromocytoma
 Intoxication with other centrally-active drugs
 Concomitant use of levodopa
 Acute porphyria
 Comatose state or CNS depression
 Bone-marrow suppression

Cautions
 Pre-existing Parkinson's disease
 Patients under 18 years of age (insufficient clinical data)
 Pre-existing severe heart disease/bradycardia, or hypokalemia (predisposing to long QT syndrome and severe arrhythmias)
 Patients with pre-existing epilepsy. Anticonvulsant therapy should be maintained
 Lithium use — increased risk of neurological side effects of both drugs

Pregnancy and lactation
 Pregnancy: Animal studies did not reveal any embryotoxicity or fetotoxicity, nor did limited human experience. Due to insufficient human data, pregnant women should be treated with sulpiride only if strictly indicated. Additionally, the newborns of treated women should be monitored, because isolated cases of extrapyramidal side effects have been reported.
 Lactation: Sulpiride is found in the milk of lactating women. Since the consequences are unclear, women should not breastfeed during treatment.

Side effects
Sulpiride is usually well tolerated, producing few adverse effects. Their incidences are as follows:

 Common (>1%) adverse effects
 Dizziness
 Headache
 Extrapyramidal side effects
- Tremor
- Dystonia
- Akathisia — a sense of inner restlessness that presents itself with the inability to stay still
- Parkinsonism
 Somnolence (not a very prominent adverse effect considering its lack of α1 adrenergic, histamine and muscarinic acetylcholine receptor affinity)
 Insomnia
 Weight gain or loss
 Hyperprolactinemia (elevated plasma levels of the hormone, prolactin which can, in turn lead to sexual dysfunction, galactorrhea, amenorrhea, gynecomastia, etc.)
 Nausea
 Vomiting
 Nasal congestion
 Anticholinergic adverse effects such as:
- Dry mouth
- Constipation
- Blurred vision
 Impaired concentration

 Rare (<1% incidence) adverse effects
 Tardive dyskinesia — a rare, often permanent movement disorder that, more often than not, results from prolonged treatment with antidopaminergic agents such as antipsychotics. It presents with slow (hence tardive), involuntary, repetitive and purposeless movements that most often affect the facial muscles. 
 Neuroleptic malignant syndrome — a rare, life-threatening complication that results from the use of antidopaminergic agents. Its incidence increases with concomitant use of lithium (medication) salts
 Blood dyscrasias — rare, sometimes life-threatening complications of the use of a number of different antipsychotics (most notably clozapine) which involves abnormalities in the composition of a person's blood (e.g. having too few white blood cells per unit volume of blood). Examples include: 
- Agranulocytosis — a significant drop in white blood cell count, leaving individuals wide open to life-threatening opportunistic infections
- Neutropenia
- Leucopenia
- Leukocytosis
 Seizures
 Torsades de pointes

 Unknown incidence adverse effects include
 QTc interval prolongation which can lead to potentially fatal arrhythmias.
 Cholestatic jaundice
 Elevated liver enzymes
 Primary biliary cirrhosis
 Allergic reactions
 Photosensitivity — sensitivity to light
 Skin rashes
 Depression
 Catatonia
 Palpitations
 Agitation
 Diaphoresis — sweating without a precipitating factor (e.g. increased ambient temperature)
 Hypotension — low blood pressure
 Hypertension — high blood pressure
 Venous thromboembolism (probably rare)

Overdose
Sulpiride has a relatively low order of acute toxicity. Substantial amounts may cause severe but reversible dystonic crises with torticollis, protrusion of the tongue, and/or trismus. In some cases all the classical symptoms typical of severe Parkinson's disease may be noted; in others, over-sedation/coma may occur. The treatment is largely symptomatic. Some or all extrapyramidal reactions may respond to the application of anticholinergic drugs such as biperiden or benzatropine. All patients should be closely monitored for signs of long QT syndrome and severe arrhythmias.

Interactions
Sulpiride neither inhibits nor stimulates cytochrome P450 family (CYP) of oxidizing enzymes in human, thus would not cause clinically significant interactions with other drugs, which are metabolized by CYPs. However, the risk or severity of adverse effects can be increased when sulpiride is combined with other drugs, but this is not related to substrates, inducers and inhibitors of CYPs.

Pharmacology

Pharmacodynamics

Sulpiride is a selective antagonist at dopamine D2, D3 and 5-HT1A receptors.  Antagonism at 5-HT1A dominates in doses exceeding 600 mg daily. In doses of 600 to 1,600 mg sulpiride shows mild sedating and antipsychotic activity. Its antipsychotic potency compared to chlorpromazine is only 0.2 (1/5). In low doses (in particular 50 to 200 mg daily) its prominent feature is antagonism of presynaptic inhibitory dopamine and serotonin receptors, accounting for some antidepressant activity and a stimulating effect. Additionally, it alleviates vertigo.

The benzamide neuroleptics (including sulpiride, amisulpride, and sultopride) have been shown to activate the endogenous gamma-hydroxybutyrate receptor in vivo at therapeutic concentrations. Sulpiride was found in one study in rats to upregulate GHB receptors. GHB has neuroleptic properties and it is believed binding to this receptor may contribute to the effects of these neuroleptics.

Sulpiride, along with clozapine, and valproate has been found to activate DNA demethylation in the brain.

Although amisulpride and sulpiride being clinically identic in many ways, for example, its both highly unmetabolized excretion or in its pharmacology by triggering dopamine autoreceptors or by having no affinity for 5ht2a receptors they differ significantly in their affinity for dopamine receptors with amisulpride having high occupancy at low doses, reaching 90% at therapeutic doses, sulpiride not really exceed 60% even at high doses.

History
Sulpiride was discovered in 1966 as a result of a research program by Justin-Besançon and C. Laville at Laboratoires Delagrange who were working to improve the anti-dysrhythmic properties of procainamide; the program led first to metoclopramide and later to sulpiride. Laboratoires Delagrange was acquired by Synthelabo in 1991 which eventually became part of Sanofi.

Society and culture

Brand names
Sulpiride is marketed under the brand names Dogmatil (DE, HK, SG, PH), Dolmatil (IE, UK), Eglonyl (RU, ZA, HR, SI), Espiride (ZA), Modal (IL), Prometar (UY), Equilid (BR) and Sulpor (UK), among many others.

Medicinal forms 
These include tablet and oral solution

Patient Aversions 
Some individuals from the Caribbean region may have an aversion to taking the medication due to the association with the brand name of Dogmatil. Dogmatil has been associated with dog medication.

Research
Sulpiride has been studied for use as a hormonal contraceptive in women in whom conventional oral contraceptives are contraindicated and to potentiate progestogen-only contraceptives. The contraceptive effects of sulpiride are due to its prolactin-releasing and antigonadotropic effects and the hyperprolactinemia–amenorrhea state that it induces.

Since the use of psychotropic drugs is efficient in treating irritable bowel syndrome (IBS), sulpiride is studied as potential sole maintenance therapy in the treatment of IBS.

References

External links
 

Atypical antipsychotics
Antigonadotropins
Benzamides
Galactagogues
GHB receptor ligands
Hormonal contraception
Phenol ethers
Prolactin releasers
Pyrrolidines
Sulfonamides